Wilner Nazaire (born 30 May 1950) is a Haitian former professional footballer who played as a defender. He appeared at the 1974 FIFA World Cup.

References

External links
 
 

1950 births
Living people
Sportspeople from Port-au-Prince
Association football defenders
Haitian footballers
Haitian expatriate footballers
Haiti international footballers
Racing CH players
Valenciennes FC players
Ligue Haïtienne players
Ligue 1 players
Ligue 2 players
Expatriate footballers in France
1974 FIFA World Cup players
Haitian expatriate sportspeople in France
CONCACAF Championship-winning players